Natural Selection is an album by guitarist Frank Gambale that was released by Wombat Records in 2010.

Reception

In a review for All About Jazz, Jack Huntley stated that the album "covers a varied musical territory but really excels on the more straight-ahead, classic-sounding tracks," and commented: "Throughout... the musicianship is wonderful and the soloists are always interesting. Gambale's style is marvelously flexible in the driving swing on most of this CD and in being so, adds a more melodic sensibility."

Track listing

Personnel
Frank Gambale – guitar, mixing, production
Otmaro Ruíz – piano
Joel Taylor – percussion
Alain Caron – bass

References

Frank Gambale albums
2011 albums